China Futures may refer to:
China futures market
China Financial Futures Exchange
China Stock Index Futures 
China Futures Company Limited